O'Brien is a British television talk show presented by James O'Brien. It was broadcast on ITV from 30 March 2015 to 10 April 2015.

Episodes

Reception
The majority has been negative with Gerard O'Donovan of The Daily Telegraph describing the show as "low rent" and "disappointing".

References

2010s British television talk shows
2015 British television series debuts
2015 British television series endings
ITV talk shows
English-language television shows